Solo Piano is an album by jazz pianist Tommy Flanagan. It was recorded in 1974 and released in 2005 by Storyville Records.

Background and recording
It was believed that the 1977 album Alone Too Long was Flanagan's first solo piano recording. Solo Piano was recorded in Zurich in 1974, when he was vocalist Ella Fitzgerald's pianist.

Music
Flanagan plays bebop numbers and standards on the album. These include "Con Alma".

Release
The album was released on CD by Storyville Records in 2005. Around half of the tracks on the album were later revealed to have been played by another pianist, so Storyville removed the CD from the catalog.

Track listing
"Parisian Thoroughfare" (Bud Powell) – 3:37
"Wail" (Powell) – 2:39
"Isn't It Romantic" (Richard Rodgers, Lorenz Hart) – 3:38  
"A Sleepin' Bee" (Harold Arlen, Truman Capote) – 4:47  
"Yesterdays" (Jerome Kern, Otto Harbach) – 3:30  
"Stompin' at the Savoy" (Edgar Sampson, Chick Webb, Benny Goodman) – 4:42  
"Passion Flower" / "Chelsea Bridge" / "The Star-Crossed Lovers" / "U.M.M.G." (Billy Strayhorn) – 11:52
"Con Alma" (Dizzy Gillespie) – 3:07  
"If You Could See Me Now" (Tadd Dameron, Carl Sigman) – 3:27  
"Ruby, My Dear" (Thelonious Monk) – 3:03  
"Lover" (Rodgers, Hart) – 2:48

Note
AllMusic suggests that "Lover" was not played by Flanagan; jazzdiscography lists it as a Flanagan performance. Other tracks, consistently listed as being by a different pianist, are not listed here.

Personnel
Tommy Flanagan – piano

References

1974 albums
Solo piano jazz albums
Storyville Records albums
Tommy Flanagan albums